Penya Esportiva Sant Jordi is a Spanish football club based in Sant Josep de sa Talaia, in the island of Ibiza, in the Balearic Islands. Founded in 1949, it plays in Tercera División RFEF – Group 11, holding home games at Campo Municipal Kiko Serra, with a capacity of 2,000 people.

History
Founded in 1949 under the name of CD San Jorge, the club switched to the current name in 1988, when they established a first team in the Regional Preferente. The club played in that division until 2015, when they ceased activities for one year.

Sant Jordi achieved promotion to Tercera División in 2020. During the season, the club reached the play-offs, but they were knocked out by RCD Mallorca B.

Season to season

1 season in Tercera División
1 season in Tercera División RFEF

References

External links
 
Soccerway team profile

Sport in Ibiza
Football clubs in the Balearic Islands
Association football clubs established in 1949
1949 establishments in Spain